Gartness is a hamlet in Stirling, Scotland. It is located 1.8 miles/2.9 km from Killearn and 3.1 miles/5 km from Drymen. Most pupils attend Killearn Primary School and senior pupils attend Balfron High School. The Endrick Water passes through the hamlet.

In 1572, John Napier had an estate at Gartness with his second wife, Agnes Chisholm.

Etymology
The name derives from the Scottish Gaelic Gart an Easa, which means "enclosed field by the stream".

Facilities
Whilst the hamlet has no facilities, there is an honesty shop serving walkers on the famous West Highland Way, and Drymen Camping, a campsite along the road towards Drymen, also directly on the trail.

References

External links

Vision of Britain - Gartness
Canmore - Gartness Castle
Caledonian Mercury - The Pots of Gartness

Hamlets in Stirling (council area)